The Jack Dempsey vs. Tommy Gibbons fight was a bout for boxing's world heavyweight title. It was held on July 4, 1923, in the town of Shelby, Montana, USA.

Before the fight
In 1922, oil was discovered in Shelby, making it the only city in northern Montana to have the material.

Because of the California economy and the influence of the Hollywood film industry, many people traveled west with dreams of becoming rich and famous. Shelby had a train service, and the town's officials thought it would be wise to try to make the city an economic and tourist center. The money would be provided by revenues that the oil found in the area would bring. Multiple bank branches had opened there since the discovery, and many families would move in, or, at least, pass by and spend their money as tourists, according to plans.

The first stage on this plan, which failed in great part because of the Dempsey vs. Gibbons fight, was to bring a fight for the world heavyweight boxing title to town. Dempsey was a member of the Big Five, alongside Red Grange, Bobby Jones, Bill Tilden and Babe Ruth. Being an idol all over the United States made Dempsey an attraction. The fact that his manager, Jack Kearns, and his promoter, Tex Rickard, to whom many refer today as  the Don King of his era, were also famous, made city officials even more convinced that a large crowd would visit Shelby for the fight, in hopes of seeing Kearns and Rickard as well as the fight. Shelby also figured people would be attracted to running into Dempsey in town, or maybe another member of the Big Five, should they make it to Montana to see the fight. There were no television networks so whoever wanted to see the fight live would have to go to Shelby.

Officials chose Tommy Gibbons, whose brother Mike was better known as a former world champion, to challenge Dempsey. But Gibbons proved the plan's first failure, as he was unknown except to boxing fans. Gibbons was strong, but not in Dempsey's level.

Thinking patriotism would play a part in the promotion, the city chose July 4, the United States' independence day. A large arena was built over a farm. The area is now known as Champion's Field.

Kearns asked Shelby officials to guarantee him and the champion an advance for their traveling costs, as airplanes were available at the time but not safe, and train travel to Montana from the more populated areas of the United States took up to a week (it is said that Dempsey and Kearns took a week to get there by train). He also asked for the champion to have a guaranteed purse.  So Kearns convinced Shelby to commit money or lose the fight to somewhere else.

Gibbons, while not a champion, was a professional and he needed money as well. He reportedly took 150,000 dollars to fight Dempsey.

Shelby officials, again believing they would be the beneficiaries, agreed to every demand by both boxers and their management and promotional teams. Area banks were to provide the money to stage the event. Dempsey was received at the train station by thousands of residents, which gave the city officials even more hope that the fight would be a success.

The fight
The fight was scheduled for the then almost regular distance of 15 rounds. Dempsey was considered an aggressor: He had dropped Jess Willard seven times in the first round before winning the title from Willard by stopping him in round three, retaining the title with knockouts over Bill Brennan and Georges Carpentier, among others. Because of this, the fight was thought to be a possible action bout, but instead it was quite strategic. Dempsey constantly threw punches to Gibbons' head, with Gibbons trying to attack Dempsey's body. As a consequence, Gibbons was able to duck many of Dempsey's shots. Dempsey's mobility, however, made it hard for Gibbons to punch Dempsey's stomach and ribs.

There were some isolated moments of action: Dempsey is said to have had Gibbons hurt in round seven, but he could not score a knockout. Gibbons landed hard punches to Dempsey's chin once in a while, but Dempsey shrugged the punches off. In the end, Dempsey retained the title with a 15-round unanimous decision.

Aftermath
The aftermath was worse than the fight for Shelby: a large arena, the size of a football field, had been built. Since most of Shelby's residents and those of nearby cities could not afford ticket prices set so that the city could come up with the money guaranteed to the participants, only 7,702 paying fans showed up, making the fight one of the biggest economical disasters in boxing history. An estimated 13,000 people got to see the fight free.

Four banks in Shelby went bankrupt in the months following the fight. The town's dreams of prosperity went away with them.

Stampede
Taking advantage of the crowds brought to town for the boxing match, two rodeos were held.  One rodeo was produced by the Knight and Day Stampede Company out of Alberta, as the Shelby Stampede and was staged in the world's largest rodeo arena.  This rodeo arena was built in a circular design that had seating for 20,000 people. The Knight and Day Stampede Company was a partnership between millionaire ranchers Raymond Knight of Raymond, Alberta and Addison Day of Medicine Hat, Alberta. Another rodeo, the Marias Fair and Rodeo was held at the same time but on the other side of town.  These rodeos, like the boxing match, were not financially successful.  The world's largest rodeo arena was torn down after the crowds went home.

Shelby Town Hall
A town hall building for Shelby was built in just two months in 1923 to serve as headquarters for media for the fight.  The building survives and is listed on the National Register of Historic Places.

External links
 Newspaper Article: Great Falls Tribune - Dempsey versus Gibbons on July 4, 1923
 Newspaper Article: The Missoulian - Famed fight that KO'd Shelby: Fortunes exhausted to bring boxing match to small town in 1923
 Newspaper Article: The LA Times - Town in Montana Was Overmatched : In 1923, Shelby--Population 500--Took On Jack Dempsey and His Manager
 Newspaper article: Chicago Tribune - Heavyweight disaster
 Article: newgeography - FIGHTING SPIRIT LIVES ON IN NORTHERN MONTANA (About the building of the Jack Dempsey fight memorial in Shelby, Montana)
 Article: Vice Sports - The Night Jack Dempsey Bankrupted a Town
 Article: Boxing.com - Dempsey vs. Gibbons: The Fight that Ruined a Town
 Article: BoxRec - Jack Dempsey vs. Tommy Gibbons
 Article: Boxing Insider - The Title Fight That May Have Brought Down A Town: Dempsey-Gibbons
 Archived video footage: Jack Dempsey vs Tommy Gibbons (July 1923)
 Archived video footage: Jack Dempsey vs Tommy Gibbons (Full Film), part 1/5
 Archived video footage: Jack Dempsey vs Tommy Gibbons (Full Film), part 2/5
 Archived video footage: Jack Dempsey vs Tommy Gibbons (Full Film), part 3/5
 Archived video footage: Jack Dempsey vs Tommy Gibbons (Full Film), part 4/5
 Archived video footage: Jack Dempsey vs Tommy Gibbons (Full Film), part 5/5
 - Archived Photo: Jack Dempsey vs. Tommy Gibbons - Aerial View of Arena in Shelby, MT - Archive Photo - 1923
 Archived photos: Getty Images - Jack Dempsey v Tommy Gibbons -1 PICTURE
 Archived newspaper: SPRINGFIELD REPUBLICAN, Mass., July 5, 1923, Jack Dempsey vs. Tommy Gibbons at Shelby, Montana...
 Images of Jack Dempsey and Tommy Gibbons Worlds Heavyweight Championship Full Boxing Ticket dated July 4th 1923 from Shelby, Montana.
 Scholarly Article: Jack Dempsey Revisited (pp. 112-128), The Boxing Scene (2009), by Thomas Hauser, Temple University Press.
 Book: Shelby's Folly: Jack Dempsey, Doc Kearns, and the Shakedown of a Montana Boomtown, by Jason Kelly
 Scholarly Article: History of the crude oil industry in Montana, by Richard Dale Hennip
 Website for Champions Park, the memorial erected in Shelby, Montana commemorating the Jack Dempsey vs. Tommy Gibbons fight of 1923

History of Montana
Gibbons
1923 in boxing
Boxing in Montana
Toole County, Montana
1923 in sports in Montana
July 1923 sports events